Catoctin Creek is a  tributary of the Potomac River in Frederick County, Maryland, USA. Its source is formed in the Myersville, Maryland area and flows directly south for the entire length of the stream.  Catoctin Creek enters the Potomac River east of Brunswick. The stream flows through Catoctin Creek Park.

See also 
List of rivers of Maryland

References

External links 
Monocacy & Catoctin Watershed Alliance
Catoctin Creek Park

Rivers of Frederick County, Maryland
Rivers of Maryland
Tributaries of the Potomac River